A meteor exploded over Syracuse, New York on December 2, 2020, shortly after noon EST (approximately 17:08 UTC).

Event
The sonic boom rattled numerous houses and windows. The explosion was heard throughout Central New York and registered by seismographs. The American Meteor Society received 181 reports from citizen scientists, with the fireball sighted in New York, Maryland, Minnesota, Ohio, Ontario, Pennsylvania, and Virginia.

See also

 Kamchatka meteor

References

History of Syracuse, New York
2020 in New York (state)
December 2020 events in the United States
Modern Earth impact events
Meteoroids
2020 in space